Falcuna hollandi is a butterfly in the family Lycaenidae. It is found in Cameroon, Equatorial Guinea, the Democratic Republic of the Congo, Angola and the Republic of the Congo. The habitat consists of primary forests.

Subspecies
Falcuna hollandi hollandi (Angola, Democratic Republic of the Congo: Lulua, Kasai and southern Sankuru)
Falcuna hollandi nigricans Stempffer & Bennett, 1963 (Congo, Democratic Republic of the Congo: Uele, Tshuapa, Equateur, Sankuru and Lualaba)
Falcuna hollandi suffusa Stempffer & Bennett, 1963 (Cameroon, Equatorial Guinea: Mbini)

References

Butterflies described in 1899
Poritiinae
Butterflies of Africa
Taxa named by Per Olof Christopher Aurivillius